Humibacter albus is a Gram-positive, strictly aerobic and motile bacterium from the genus Humibacter which has been isolated from sewage sludge from Porto in Portugal.

References

Microbacteriaceae
Bacteria described in 2008